The Treasure House is a historic building located in Staten Island, New York City, New York, US. Samuel Grasset, a tanner and leather worker, built the original construction in approximately 1700. Additions were made in 1740, 1790 and 1860. Subsequent owners of the house in subsequent centuries include a cord wainer (shoemaker), innkeeper, stonemason, and coach trimmer. A number of local businesses have also occupied the structure. The house was named after a legend that a cache of American Revolutionary War era gold coins was discovered during renovation in about 1860.

See also 
 List of New York City Designated Landmarks in Staten Island
 National Register of Historic Places listings in Richmond County, New York

Sources 
Neighborhood Preservation Center, New York, New York

Historic Richmond Town
Houses in Staten Island
New York City Designated Landmarks in Staten Island